Morus serrata, known as Himalayan mulberry, is a species of mulberry native to the Himalaya and the mountains of southwestern China, at altitudes of up to .

 
It is considered by some authorities to be a variety or subspecies of white mulberry (M. alba) and is also similar to black mulberry (M. nigra).

References

External links
Flora of China: Morus serrata – eFloras.org

serrata
Flora of West Himalaya
Flora of Tibet
Trees of Pakistan